J. D. Blackfoot is a rock musician from Ohio, United States who has been recording since the early 1970s. Along with a couple of hit singles, he won an award for his album The Song of Crazy Horse.

Background
The name J. D. Blackfoot applies to both the singer and the group. Blackfoot was born Benjamin Franklin Van Dervort. Before he made his way in music, he worked in various occupations which included pest extermination, insurance sales and also as a driver. In relation possible confusion about his ethnicity, Blackfoot is not Native American. He is a convert to their plight as a result of discovering it in books while in his 20s.

Career

1960s to 1990s
Early in his career Blackfoot was going by the name Benny Van and was fronting The Ebb Tides, an Ohio band formed in 1963. For a period of time, around 1967 to 1968, the band became known as Tree. In 1969, he reformed the band around his name and the single "Who's Nuts Alfred" was released. The single was backed with "Epitaph For A Head" and had its release in the US in 1969 on Philips 40625.

In 1970, his album The Ultimate Prophecy was released on Mercury SR 61288. It contained the songs "One Time Woman" and "Angel". It was also released in twenty countries.

With his album behind him and a couple of hits, he headed to New Zealand. In 1972, he arrived there with his wife. Whilst employed by Pye, he got the director Tim Murdoch to allow him to record an album The Song of Crazy Horse. The title track, which ran for 18 minutes, was played extensively on KSHE St. Louis, KADI St. Louis, and KWK St. Louis. It was recorded at Stebbing Studio in Auckland. Musicians who played on the album were Frank Gibson Jr. on drums, Billy Kristian on bass, Mike Walker on piano, Bob Jackson on guitar and Jimmy Sloggett on saxophone. Tony Baker produced the album as well as handling the conducting chores. Producer Baker also contributed saxophone and organ.  The album became the Album of the Year, picking up 1974 RATA award.

2000s
In the early 2000s Blackfoot returned to New Zealand and while there he recorded the Co-Dependent Dysfunctional You double album. Around the mid-2000s he was still performing throughout the Midwest.

In 2007 The Ultimate Prophecy was re-released.

In October, 2016 he was inducted into the “St. Louis Classic Rock Hall of Fame. Even though he was from Columbus, Ohio, the category he was inducted in was the "Outside Influence" category for those who have had a great influence on the St. Louis music market. After 50 years of performing, he was calling it quits for performing live. The JD Blackfoot Farewell Concert was announced for May 20, 2017 at the Touhill Anheuser-Busch Performance Hall. Also in 2017, the documentary Never Say Goodbye was released. Along with Rusty Young and Jesse Colin Young, J. D. Blackfoot appeared in it.

Discography

References

External links
 Website
 AllMusic: J.D. Blackfoot
 Buckeye Beat: J. D. Blackfoot (band)
 Discogs: J.D. Blackfoot

Philips Records artists
Mercury Records artists